Boati Moloko Motau (born 2002) is a South African water polo player.

She was part of the South Africa women's national water polo team at the 2020 Tokyo Summer Olympics, where they ranked 10th.

Career statistics

References

External links
 

Living people
2002 births
South African female water polo players
Olympic water polo players of South Africa
Water polo players at the 2020 Summer Olympics
Sportspeople from Johannesburg
21st-century South African women